Adelaida Ferré i Gomis de Ruíz de Narváez (Barcelona, February 24, 1881 - Barcelona, March 9, 1955) was a Spanish historian, teacher, and folklorist associated with lace-making in Catalonia.

Early life and education
Adelaida Ferré Gomis was the daughter of the painter and decorator Pere Ferré. Her education began at the Escola Normal Superior de Mestres before attending the Municipal Conservatory of Barcelona and the Escola d'Institutrius. There, she had as a teacher the folklorist :es:Rossend Serra i Pagès.

Between the years 1902 and 1915, she received artistic training at the Escola de la Llotja. She combined her artistic studies with those at the :ca:Institut Català de les Arts del Llibre and the :es:Centro de Cultura de Mujeres Francesca Bonnemaison, where she was able to perfect her knowledge of lace-making and other crafts. One of Adelaide's teachers at this institute was :es:José Fiter e Inglés, who awakened Ferré's interest in the history of needle lace.

Career

During these years, her works were also exhibited in important exhibitions, such as the  that took place in 1910 at the Palau de les Belles Arts, organized by the Barcelona City Council.

Ferré focused both the practice of labor and the plastic arts in teaching. She taught artistic drawing and engraving at the Municipal School of Arts in the eighth district of Barcelona; modeling and engraving at the Municipal School for the blind, mute and other disabled; art history at the Women's Professional School of the Provincial Government of Barcelona; and embossed leather classes at the Saint George's School for Ladies in Barcelona and at Acción Femenina. But where Ferré spent a large part of her professional life was at the Municipal School of Trades for Women, later refounded under the name of  School (now Institut Lluïsa Cura). There, she taught embroidered lace and needle lace since 1911. She was appointed director in 1942 and retired after ten years.

Ferré's pedagogic spirit, influenced by Serra i Pagès, is clearly evident in the research she carried out on any aspect related to textile activities considered feminine, especially everything that refers to lace. Always interested in dissemination, Ferré not only practiced it through teaching in the classrooms but also in numerous conferences and in the preparation of articles.

Ferré is the historian of lace in Spain. Apart from the rigor and seriousness of her work, its relevance lies in the fact that, at the time she began to theorize about this art, the respective bibliography produced in Catalonia was very scarce. In the first stage, her studies appeared in publications such as Joventut, Art jove, and  La Veu de Catalunya, among others. Between the years 1931 and 1948, Ferré's main studies appeared in the Butlletí del Museu d'Art de Barcelona, an institution in which she collaborated by documenting its textile collection. 

From Ferré's research, a large amount of data of great value and usefulness can be obtained when tracing a history of textile production both within and outside Catalonia. She also documented and cataloged the collections of the Barcelona art museums directed by :es:Joaquim Folch i Torres. Regarding bobbin lace, Ferré showed herself in her articles as a great connoisseur of its past, but also of its present, in Catalonia and in the rest of Europe. Techniques, folklore, history or lexicon of bobbin lace, Ferré treated and studied all these aspects in depth.

Like Joan Amades and other prominent folklorists, Ferré was also interested in the international language Esperanto and in 1909, she participated in the fifth international congress of this language, held in Barcelona.

Legacy
In the present day, Ferré is remembered for having been, in a certain way and together with Francesca Bonnemaison, the origin of the :ca:Escola de Puntaires de Barcelona. It was Ferré who commissioned the sisters  to give lace classes at the Lluïsa Cura School, of which Ferré was the director. Ferré also had a close relationship with the :es:Fomento de las Artes y del Diseño and the Centre Excursionista de Catalunya. Her publications are held by the Fishing Museum of Palamós and the Library of Catalonia. The Marès Lace Museum hold two samples of bobbin lace designed by Ferré and made by :ca:Clotilde Pascual i Fibla which were displayed in the 1918 exhibition in Barcelona at the Palau de les Belles Arts organized by the Fomento de las Artes y del Diseño.

References

Further reading
 

1881 births
1955 deaths
People from Barcelona
20th-century Spanish historians
20th-century Spanish educators
Spanish folklorists
Lace
Embroidery